Contacto ('Contact') is a Portuguese language weekly tabloid newspaper in Luxembourg published by the Saint-Paul Luxembourg group. The newspaper was founded in 1970. As of the early 2000s, it was the largest Portuguese newspaper in the country, with a weekly circulation of around 8,000.

The paper caters to the large Lusophone community in Luxembourg, primarily Portuguese and Cape Verdean Luxembourgers.

References

1970 establishments in Luxembourg
Cape Verdean diaspora
Weekly newspapers published in Luxembourg
Portuguese diaspora in Europe
Portuguese-language newspapers
Publications established in 1970